An Integrity Engineering Audit is carried out within an Integrity engineering function so as to ensure compliance with international, national and company specific standards and regulations. 

It is carried out in order to prove that the system is compliant, transparent, effective and efficient.  API Recommended Practice 580, Risk-Based Inspection (see American Petroleum Institute) outlines such an audit as part of a Risk Based Inspection program.  It checks that the most efficient and cost effective implementation of inspections and integrity management programs are being carried out.  It ensures that the integrity of plant facilities including all onshore and offshore structures and pipelines, stationary equipment, piping systems are being correctly addressed.  It checks and ensures that the Integrity Engineer has identified, investigated and assessed all deterioration/corrosion as well as timely maintenance of the affected facilities.  It audits the Inspection and Corrosion Control Policy and Risk Based Inspection (RBI) methods which manage the integrity and checks that the optimum inspection frequency, maintenance cost and plant availability are being met. It may be approached under a generic framework such as ISO 19011 on the basis of a technical audit without formal documentation, but with a regulatory or statutory criteria.

References
1 Implementation of Asset Integrity Management System Muhammad Abduh PetroEnergy Magazine April – May 2008 Edition http://abduh137.wordpress.com/2008/05/04/aims/

2 Offshore Information Sheet 4/2006 Offshore Installations (Safety Case) Regulations 2005 Regulation 13 Thorough Review of a Safety Case (Revised and reissued July 2008)

3 Structural integrity management framework for fixed jacket structures Prepared by Atkins Limited for the Health and Safety Executive 2009 Research Report RR684

4 Audit of Integrity Management Systems http://www.advantica.biz/Default.aspx?page=639 

5 Plant Integrity Management Services Germanischer Lloyd 
https://web.archive.org/web/20110807181637/http://www.gl-nobledenton.com/assets/downloads/13.Plant_Integrity_Management_Services_external.pdf

6 Guidelines for Auditing Process Safety Management Systems Ccps, Center for Chemical Process Safety (CCPS) - Technology & Engineering - 2011 - 250 pages

Maintenance